Jefferson Township is a township in Grundy County, in the U.S. state of Missouri.

Jefferson Township was established in 1841, most likely taking its name from President Thomas Jefferson.

References

Townships in Missouri
Townships in Grundy County, Missouri